Robert Timothy Dowling (born June 1963) is an American journalist and author who writes a weekly column in The Guardian about his life with his family in London.

Career
Dowling worked in data entry for a films database before he became a freelance journalist, first working for GQ, then women's magazines and the Independent on Sunday. He is a columnist for The Guardian and has a weekly column in the paper's Saturday magazine, Weekend. His column replaced Jon Ronson's in 2007. He writes observational columns, often about his wife. Sam Leith of The Guardian noted that "Dowling's a very fresh and smart writer, as he needs to be. Stories about machete massacres or ebola pandemics pretty much write themselves: writing about nothing much, week in, week out, is the real test." Dowling also worked as a cartoonist for a short time.

Dowling's books include a 2001 book about disposable razor inventor King Camp Gillette, Suspicious Packages and Extendable Arms, a collection of his writing from The Guardian, and The Giles Wareing Haters' Club, his 2007 debut novel concerning a journalist Googling himself (narcissurfing) who finds an online club of people who hate him, inspired by Dowling searching for his name online. Giles Wareing was reviewed by TLS. Metro said it is "a fine comedy of domestic triviality".

Dowling said of his 2014 book How to Be a Husband: "It got quite a bit of publicity in the U.K. when it came out and [my wife] wasn't prepared for all that." Tom Hodgkinson writing in The Spectator called this book "a rare delight".  Leith in The Guardian said there is "pleasure and treasure here." David Evans wrote in The Independent: "It's a rare thing to be able to write about life as a husband and father in such a way as to elicit nods of recognition among those who are neither of those things; Dowling does it with panache."

Published work
Inventor of the Disposable Culture: King Camp Gillette 1855–1932 (Faber & Faber, 2001)
Not the Archer prison diary (Ebury Press, 2002, 
Suspicious Packages & Extendable Arms (Guardian Newspapers Ltd, 2007)
The Giles Wareing Haters' Club (Picador, 2008)
How to Be a Husband (Fourth Estate, 2014)
Dad You Suck (Fourth Estate, 2017)

Personal life
Dowling was born in Connecticut. His mother was a schoolteacher, his father was a dentist, and he has a brother and two sisters. He moved to the UK from New York at the age of 27 and currently lives in London with his wife Sophie de Brandt and their three sons. He enjoys skiing with his sons, having learned to ski as a child in the US.

Dowling has played banjo (which his wife bought for his birthday) in the band Police Dog Hogan since 2009, and he writes self-deprecatingly about their festival gigs, including Glastonbury, in his column.

References

External links
 Tim Dowling's Guardian column with full archives

1963 births
American newspaper journalists
Living people
The Guardian journalists
Writers from Connecticut